Issidae is a family of planthoppers described by Spinola in 1839, belonging to the order Hemiptera, suborder Auchenorrhyncha superfamily Fulgoroidea.

Distribution
Species of this family are present throughout the Northern Hemisphere.

Description

Issidae are small insects generally with a stocky body, as the wings mainly develop in width. Basic body coloration is not striking, usually shows brownish colors. The head has two ocelli. The forewings have strong pronounced ribs. They wrap the abdomen when the insect is at rest. The family originally included approximately 1000 species with 215 genera, but the systematics of Issidae remains uncertain, with many of the subfamilies having been recently removed to separate families, including Caliscelidae. Nogodinidae, and Tropiduchidae.

In 2013, scientists described a biologically unique set of mechanical gears in an Issus nymph, though identical structures are known in most planthoppers, and were known for decades before the function of the gears was discovered

Taxonomy 
The family Issidae was once large and included many groups which are now treated in other families or as families themselves. These groups include the Caliscelidae, Nogodinidae, and Tropiduchidae (e.g., subfamilies Tonginae and Trienopinae). Around 2003, there was a view in favour of a single subfamily Issinae, but the current consensus is placement in four (as below).  The Catalogue of Life lists genera in five tribes Issini, Parahiraciini, Hemisphaeriini and Thioniini.  The tribe Colpopterini have now been placed in family Nogodinidae Melichar, 1898 having been raised to a subfamily. The oldest fossil of the group is Cubicostissus of the Paleocene Menat Formation of France, belonging to the tribe Hysteropterini, molecular clock calibrations suggest a diversification during the Upper Cretaceous.

Subfamilies, Tribes and selected Genera 
Fulgoromorpha Lists On the Web lists four subfamilies:

Hemisphaeriinae 
Authority: Melichar, 1906
 Hemisphaeriini Melichar, 1906
 Gergithus
 Hemisphaerius
 Kodaianellini Wang, Zhang & Bourgoin, 2016
 Parahiraciini Cheng & Yang, 1991
†Bolbossus Gnezdilov & Bourgoin, 2016 Baltic amber, Eocene (Priabonian)
 Sarimini Wang, Zhang & Bourgoin, 2016
 Hemisphaeriinae incertae sedis

Hysteropterinae 
Authority: Melichar, 1906; there are currently 61 genera including:
 Agalmatium Emeljanov, 1971
 Falcidius Stål, 1866
 Hysteropterum Amyot & Audinet-Serville, 1843 - type genus
†Cubicostissus Bourgoin & Nel, 2020 Menat Formation, France, Paleocene (Selandian)

Issinae 
The monotypic subfamily contains tribe Issini Spinola, 1839 and has a widespread distribution in Europe, the Middle East and temperate Asia.  There are currently four genera:
 †Issites Haupt, 1956 Germany, Eocene (Lutetian)
 Issus Brullé, 1832 – type genus
 Latissus Dlabola, 1974
 Sinonissus Wang, Shi & Bourgoin, 2018

Thioniinae 
Authority: Melichar, 1906
There are currently 3 tribes:
 Cordelini Gnezdilov, 2019 (1 genus)
 Cordela Gnezdilov, 2019
 Guianaphrynini Gnezdilov, 2018 (1 genus)
 Guianaphryna Gnezdilov, 2018
 Thioniini Melichar, 1906 (14 genera)
 Oronoqua Fennah, 1947
 Cheiloceps Uhler, 1895
 Thionia Stal, 1859
 Waorania Gnezdilov & Bartlett, 2018

Issidae incertae sedis 
Twenty genera are currently placed here:

 Abolloptera Gnezdilov & O'Brien, 2006
 Argepara Gnezdilov & O'Brien, 2008
 Aztecus Gnezdilov & O'Brien, 2008
 Balduza Gnezdilov & O'Brien, 2006
 Bumaya Gnezdilov & O'Brien, 2008
 Carydiopterum Gnezdilov, 2017
 Delongana Caldwell, 1945
 Exortus Gnezdilov, 2004
 Gilda Walker, 1870
 Incasa Gnezdilov & O'Brien, 2008
 Kathleenum Gnezdilov, 2004
 Paralixes Caldwell, 1945
 Sarnus Stål, 1866
 Stilbometopius Gnezdilov & O'Brien, 2006
 Traxanellus Caldwell, 1945
 Traxus Metcalf, 1923
 Tylanira Ball, 1936
 Ulixes Stål, 1861
 Ulixoides Haupt, 1918

Uphodato Szwedo 2019, Krundia Szwedo 2019 and Breukoscelis Szwedo 2019 from the Bembridge Marls, England dating Eocene (Priabonian) were considered members of this family upon description, however, other authors have found assignation to Issidae dubious.

References 

 W. E. Holzinger, I. Kammerlander, H. Nickel: The Auchenorrhyncha of Central Europe - Die Zikaden Mitteleuropas. Volume 1: Fulgoromorpha, Cicadomorpha excl. Cicadellidae. - Brill, Leiden 2003
 Stephen W. Wilson – Keys to the families of Fulgoromorpha with emphasis on planthoppers of potential importance in the Southern United States -Florida Entomologist 88(4)  Fcla.edu

External links 
 Fauna Europaea
 Biolib

 
Auchenorrhyncha families
Fulgoromorpha
Taxa named by Maximilian Spinola